is a retired Japanese competitive figure skater. She is the 2015 Triglav Trophy silver medalist and 2016 Asian Open Figure Skating Trophy champion.

Personal life 
Matsuda was born on July 22, 1998, in Nagoya, Aichi Prefecture, Japan.

Career

Early years 
Matsuda began skating in 2005. In the 2011–2012 season, she placed 23rd at the Japan Junior Championships and won gold at the 2012 International Challenge Cup on the novice level.

2012–2013 season 
Matsuda debuted on the ISU Junior Grand Prix (JGP) circuit in the 2012–2013 season, finishing 6th at her event in Courchevel, France. After placing 4th at the Japan Junior Championships, she made her senior national debut, placing 8th at the 2012–13 Japan Championships. She ended her season with a silver medal on the junior level at the 2013 Triglav Trophy.

2013–2014 season 
During the 2013–2014 season, Matsuda placed 9th at her JGP event in Riga, Latvia. After winning the junior national bronze medal, she placed 9th on the senior level at the Japan Championships. She closed her season by winning the 2014 Coupe du Printemps on the junior level.

2014–2015 season 
In the 2014–2015 season, Matsuda placed 5th at the Japan Junior Championships and 15th at the Japan Championships. Making her senior international debut, she won the silver medal at the 2015 Triglav Trophy.

2015–2016 to present 
Scoring personal bests in all segments, Matsuda won the bronze medal at her 2015 JGP event in Logroño, Spain. She made her Grand Prix debut at the 2016 Rostelecom Cup.

Programs

Competitive highlights 
GP: Grand Prix; CS: Challenger Series; JGP: Junior Grand Prix

References

External links 
 

1998 births
Japanese female single skaters
Living people
Figure skaters from Nagoya